Deep Wells is a ghost town in Eureka County, Nevada in the United States.

History

Deep Wells was a stage station between Cherry Creek and Wells, Nevada.  Later it was a stop on the Eureka and Palisade Railroad, although the town existed before the arriving of the railroad in 1874. The town was used as a water stop. Nowadays the only trace of the town is  the ruins of a windmill.

References

Ghost towns in Eureka County, Nevada
Ghost towns in Nevada